Polat power station is a 51-megawatt coal-fired power station in Turkey in Kütahya Province, which burns lignite and receives capacity payments.

References

External links 

 Polat power station on Global Energy Monitor

Coal-fired power stations in Turkey